A number of ships have been named Jessmore, including:

 , torpedoed and sunk in 1917
 , in service 1946–58

Ship names